Crestwood Summit is a highway pass through the Cuyamaca Mountains of southeastern San Diego County, California, traversed by Interstate 8. Its elevation is  westbound, and  eastbound. It is the highest point on Interstate 8.

Of the four  highway summits east of San Diego, the first highway summit has been unnamed until "Carpenter Summit" was proposed in late 2019, now pending the United States Geological Survey approval. The second is Laguna Summit. Then comes the Crestwood Summit followed by the Tecate Divide.

The highway summit was named after Crestwood Road that runs north from Old Highway 80 and underneath I-8. It continues past the end of the county road into the Indian reservation. It is listed as BIA Rd. on Google Maps but clearly as Crestwood Road on Google Street View.View by clicking here

The reservation of the La Posta Band of Diegueno Mission Indians occupies the summit, and the band maintained the La Posta casino at the summit until its closure in 2012. It was at 777 Crestwood Road, Boulevard, CA 91905.

That casino has been replaced by the "Golden Acorn Casino" supervised by the Campo Band of Diegueño Mission Indians, also known as the Campo Kumeyaay Nation, a federally recognized tribe of Kumeyaay people on the Campo Indian Reservation. The Self Determination Act of 1975, and by 1978, "the Campo people designated the area near the Crestwood freeway off-ramp as an area for economic development." Muht Hei, Inc. is the tribe's corporation.

Google Street view of the I-8 summit area.

References

See also 
Interstate 8 at California Highways
Interstate 8 at the Interstate Guide
Interstate 8 in California and Arizona at AA Roads

Mountain passes of California
Interstate 8
Mountain ranges of San Diego County, California